Dixon Naval Radio Transmitter Facility is a facility of the US Navy in Dixon, California, United States for military radio transmissions in the shortwave and VLF range. The facility, which covers an area of 1314 acres, was operated continuously by the US Navy until 1979, when it was converted to a contractor-operated facility.

Until the end of the 1990s, the station was controlled by the Naval Communications Station, Stockton, California. Naval Computer and Telecommunications Station San Diego has oversight of operations via contract.

References

Radio masts and towers in the United States
Towers in California
Communications and electronic installations of the United States Navy
Installations of the United States Navy in California
Dixon, California
Buildings and structures in Solano County, California